Lake Havasu High School is a high school in Lake Havasu City, Arizona under the jurisdiction of the Lake Havasu Unified School District. Its graduation rate is 86%.

The district, and therefore the high school's attendance boundary, includes Lake Havasu, Crystal Beach, and Desert Hills.

Notable alumni
 Michael Biehn (1974), actor, known for playing Kyle Reese in The Terminator
 Bob Milacki, former MLB player (Baltimore Orioles, Cleveland Indians, Kansas City Royals, Seattle Mariners)

References

Public high schools in Arizona
Lake Havasu City, Arizona
Schools in Mohave County, Arizona